Sancroft International is a London-based international sustainability consultancy company founded in 1997  and chaired by former UK conservative MP John Gummer, now a member of the House of Lords (Lord Deben). Several other members of the Gummer family are involved in running the business.

Recently-published reports have investigated topics including sustainable plastics, energy infrastructure, and modern slavery in public procurement.

References

Sustainability
Organisations based in London